Condylorrhiza vestigialis, the Brazilian poplar moth or Alamo moth, is a species of moth of the family Crambidae described by Achille Guenée in 1854.  It is found in North and South America.

Food plants
The larvae feed on the Populus species.

References

Guenée 1854. in Boisduval & Guenée, Histoire naturelle des insectes. Spécies général des Lépidoptères 8: 321

External links

Spilomelinae
Moths described in 1854